Operation Sheepskin was a British military operation in the Caribbean, aimed at restoring British rule to the island of Anguilla, after the island had declared itself as an independent Republic. The British government dispatched two Royal Navy ships and 300 soldiers of the 2nd Battalion, Parachute Regiment and 22 officers of the Metropolitan Police to restore order to the island. The operation was a success and British troops were met with no resistance by the islanders, as they had wanted the island to remain a British territory but with direct association with Great Britain, separate from Saint Kitts and Nevis, of which they were a part.

Background
On 27 February 1967, Britain granted the territory of Saint Christopher-Nevis-Anguilla the status of "associated state", with its own constitution and a considerable degree of self-government. Throughout its history, Anguilla was a neglected territory with a small population known for its poverty, harsh living conditions and arid land unfit for large-scale agriculture. By 1967 the situation on the island remained arduous, unlike most of their island neighbors, Anguilla lacked electricity, clean water, and the roads were severely inadequate. The neglect and rough conditions were compounded by the association with Saint Kitts and Nevis, as most aid and development went to the main island of Saint Kitts. The Chief Minister and later Premier of Saint Christopher-Nevis-Anguilla , Robert Bradshaw, didn't help matters by expressing his disdain for the island and its people. This led most Anguillians to view Bradshaw as authoritarian and many felt that he was unfairly depriving the small island of revenue, investment, and infrastructure. Many Anguillans strenuously objected to the continuing political subservience to Saint Kitts, and on 30 May (known as Anguilla Day), the Saint Kitts police were evicted from the island. The provisional government requested United States administration, which was declined. On 9 June 1967, an attack on Saint Kitts was launched by an 18-man party of Anguillians via boat to overthrow the government. The coup was a failure as only 12 men landed, 5 of whom were captured and later stood trial. On 11 July 1967, a referendum on Anguilla's secession from the fledgling state was held. The results were 1,813 votes for secession and five against. A declaration of independence (written mainly by Harvard Law professor Roger Fisher) was read publicly by Walter Hodge Declaring Anguilla as an independent Republic.
On 11 March 1969, the British government sent William Whitlock, a junior minister, as a diplomatic envoy to Anguilla in an effort to resolve the conflict and establish an interim British administration. Whitlock's proposal was rejected in part because of his treatment of the local Anguillians. Despite being greeted with British flags and chants of "God Save the Queen", Whitlock was curt and dismissive. His methods of diplomacy included a brief condescending speech, carelessly throwing leaflets at a gathered crowd, hardly acknowledging the local head of government, refusing the motorcade service arranged for him, and snubbing the plans he had made for lunch with local leader Ronald Webster. Whitlock and his delegation were subsequently ejected from the island via gunpoint.
Whitlock returned to Britain, reporting the ordeal, as well as mischaracterizing the island as being run by mafia-like gangsterism and foreign influence.

The Operation
On 19 March 1969, a contingent of 300 2nd Battalion, Parachute Regiment, plus 22 London Metropolitan Police peacefully landed by helicopter and landing craft on the island from the two frigates, ostensibly to "restore order".
Not a single shot was fired during the operation and British troops were greeted by foreign journalists and Anguillians. The invasion was met with indignation by some Anguillians but the soldiers encountered no resistance and found no elements of intimidation, mafia presence, or even the expected firearms. The British soldiers then worked on a 'hearts and minds' campaign whilst on the island to improve relations with the islanders. Six weeks after the operation had taken place, the initial paratroopers were flown back to Britain and a second force of paratroopers (B Company) stayed on the island until 14 September 1969 to maintain security. The invasion drew ire and ridicule at home and abroad, with the world press dubbing it "the Bay of Piglets". The invasion was a global public-relations embarrassment, contributing to the defeat of Harold Wilson at the 1970 general elections. Eventually, the islanders were happy with the political situation and no more civil strife took place following the operation. Anguilla officially seceded from Saint Kitts and Nevis in 1980. The island remains a British territory to this day.

References 

British military history articles needing attention
History of Anguilla
1969 in Saint Kitts-Nevis-Anguilla
Military operations involving the United Kingdom
Conflicts in 1969
History of the Metropolitan Police